In mathematics, especially the usage of linear algebra in mathematical physics, Einstein notation (also known as the  Einstein summation convention or Einstein summation notation) is a notational convention that implies summation over a set of indexed terms in a formula, thus achieving brevity. As part of mathematics it is a notational subset of Ricci calculus; however, it is often used in physics applications that do not distinguish between tangent and cotangent spaces. It was introduced to physics by Albert Einstein in 1916.

Introduction

Statement of convention

According to this convention, when an index variable appears twice in a single term and is not otherwise defined (see Free and bound variables), it implies summation of that term over all the values of the index. So where the indices can range over the set ,

 

is simplified by the convention to:

 

The upper indices are not exponents but are indices of coordinates, coefficients or basis vectors. Typically,  would be equivalent to the traditional .

In general relativity, a common convention is that
 the Greek alphabet is used for space and time components, where indices take on values 0, 1, 2, or 3 (frequently used letters are ),
 the Latin alphabet is used for spatial components only, where indices take on values 1, 2, or 3 (frequently used letters are ),

In general, indices can range over any indexing set, including an infinite set. This should not be confused with a typographically similar convention used to distinguish between tensor index notation and the closely related but distinct basis-independent abstract index notation.

An index that is summed over is a summation index, in this case "". It is also called a dummy index since any symbol can replace "" without changing the meaning of the expression (provided that it does not collide with other index symbols in the same term).

An index that is not summed over is a free index and should appear only once per term.  If such an index does appear, it usually also appears in every other term in an equation. An example of a free index is the "" in the equation , which is equivalent to the equation .

Application

Einstein notation can be applied in slightly different ways. Typically, each index occurs once in an upper (superscript) and once in a lower (subscript) position in a term; however, the convention can be applied more generally to any repeated indices within a term. When dealing with covariant and contravariant vectors, where the position of an index also indicates the type of vector, the first case usually applies; a covariant vector can only be contracted with a contravariant vector, corresponding to summation of the products of coefficients.

Vector representations

Superscripts and subscripts versus only subscripts 

In terms of covariance and contravariance of vectors,
 upper indices represent components of contravariant vectors (vectors),
 lower indices represent components of covariant vectors (covectors).

They transform contravariantly or covariantly, respectively, with respect to change of basis.

In recognition of this fact, the following notation uses the same symbol both for a vector or covector and its components, as in:

The basis vector elements  are each column vectors, and the covector basis elements  are each row covectors. (See also #Abstract description; duality, below and the examples)

In the presence of a non-degenerate form (an isomorphism , for instance a Riemannian metric or Minkowski metric), one can raise and lower indices.

However, if one changes coordinates, the way that coefficients change depends on the variance of the object, and one cannot ignore the distinction; see Covariance and contravariance of vectors.

Mnemonics

In the above example, vectors are represented as  matrices (column vectors), while covectors are represented as  matrices (row covectors).

When using the column vector convention:

 "Upper indices go up to down; lower indices go left to right."
 "Covariant tensors are row vectors that have indices that are below (co-row-below)."
 Covectors are row vectors:  Hence the lower index indicates which column you are in.
 Contravariant vectors are column vectors:  Hence the upper index indicates which row you are in.

Abstract description 

The virtue of Einstein notation is that it represents the invariant quantities with a simple notation.

In physics, a scalar is invariant under transformations of basis. In particular, a Lorentz scalar is invariant under a Lorentz transformation. The individual terms in the sum are not. When the basis is changed, the components of a vector change by a linear transformation described by a matrix. This led Einstein to propose the convention that repeated indices imply the summation is to be done.

As for covectors, they change by the inverse matrix. This is designed to guarantee that the linear function associated with the covector, the sum above, is the same no matter what the basis is.

The value of the Einstein convention is that it applies to other vector spaces built from  using the tensor product and duality. Any tensor  in  can be written as:

 

where  is the Kronecker delta. As
 

the row/column coordinates on a matrix correspond to the upper/lower indices on the tensor product.

Common operations in this notation 

In Einstein notation, the usual element reference  for the th row and th column of matrix  becomes . We can then write the following operations in Einstein notation as follows.

Inner product (hence also vector dot product) 

Using an orthogonal basis, the inner product is the sum of corresponding components multiplied together:

 

This can also be calculated by multiplying the covector on the vector.

Vector cross product 

Again using an orthogonal basis (in 3 dimensions) the cross product intrinsically involves summations over permutations of components:

 

where

 

Matrix-vector multiplication 

The product of a matrix  with a column vector  is :

 

equivalent to

 

This is a special case of matrix multiplication.

Matrix multiplication 

 

equivalent to

Trace 

For a square matrix , the trace is the sum of the diagonal elements, hence the sum over a common index .

Outer product 

The outer product of the column vector  by the row vector  yields an  matrix :

 

Since  and  represent two different indices, there is no summation and the indices are not eliminated by the multiplication.

Raising and lowering indices 

Given a tensor, one can raise an index or lower an index by contracting the tensor with the metric tensor, . For example, taking the tensor , one can lower an index:

 

Or one can raise an index:

See also 
 Tensor
 Abstract index notation
 Bra–ket notation
 Penrose graphical notation
 Levi-Civita symbol
 DeWitt notation

Notes
This applies only for numerical indices. The situation is the opposite for abstract indices. Then, vectors themselves carry upper abstract indices and covectors carry lower abstract indices, as per the example in the introduction of this article. Elements of a basis of vectors may carry a lower numerical index and an upper abstract index.

References

Bibliography
 .

External links

 
 

Mathematical notation
Multilinear algebra
Tensors
Riemannian geometry
Mathematical physics
Albert Einstein